In number theory, a branch of mathematics, a Hilbert number is a positive integer of the form . The Hilbert numbers were named after David Hilbert.
The sequence of Hilbert numbers begins 1, 5, 9, 13, 17, ... )

Properties
The sum of a Hilbert number amount of Hilbert numbers (1 number, 5 numbers, 9 numbers, etc.) is also a Hilbert number.

Hilbert primes
A Hilbert prime is a Hilbert number that is not divisible by a smaller Hilbert number (other than 1). The sequence of Hilbert primes begins

5, 9, 13, 17, 21, 29, 33, 37, 41, 49, ... .
A Hilbert prime is not necessarily a prime number; for example, 21 is a composite number since .  However, 21  a Hilbert prime since neither 3 nor 7 (the only factors of 21 other than 1 and itself) are Hilbert numbers.  It follows from multiplication modulo 4 that a Hilbert prime is either a prime number of the form  (called a Pythagorean prime), or a semiprime of the form .

References

External links
 
 

Integer sequences